USS LST-79 was a  in the Royal Navy during World War II.

Construction and career 
LST-79 was laid down on 28 February 1943 at Jeffersonville Boat and Machine Co., Jeffersonville, Indiana. Launched on 8 May 1943 and commissioned on 7 July 1943. The ship was later transferred to the Royal Navy and commissioned on 17 July 1943. The ship was assigned 9th LST Flotilla.

She was sunk by a German Henschel Hs 293 guided missile while off Ajaccio Harbor, Corsica, 30 September 1943. 

LST-79 was struck from the Navy Register on 11 October 1943.

Citations

Sources 

 
 
 
 

 

World War II amphibious warfare vessels of the United Kingdom
Ships built in Jeffersonville, Indiana
1943 ships
LST-1-class tank landing ships of the Royal Navy
Ships sunk by German aircraft